Sushil Kumar (15 June 1926 – 22 April 1994) was a Jain teacher and monk (later Acharya). He was a self-realized master who devoted more than 50 years to promoting non-violence, peace and knowledge of the self.

Guruji (as he is lovingly called by many of his devotees) was born on June 15, 1926 in Sikhopur, a small foothill village in Haryana, India. The village was later named  Sushilgarh in Guruji’s honor. As a seven year old he left his home to live with Shri Chotelalji Maharaj, who later become his religious guru.

When Guruji was still a young boy, Shri Roop Chandji Maharaj appeared to him in his spirit and told him to become a monk. (MAHARAJ was a great yogi and enlightened master in the family of monks to which Guruji belongs. He left his body 100 years  ago. Shri Roop Chandji Maharaj is Guruji’s Spiritual guru). In this life, Guruji was not taught yogic systems from any master. His knowledge was realised  through direct experience, and his powers were awakened through the grace  of past lives. When he was 15 years old he became a Jain muni (monk) in Swetamber Sthanakwasi sect.

During his academic career in India, he passed through a number of examinations such as Shastri, Acharya, Sahitya-Ratna, Vidya-Ratna, etc., and mastered the classical studies of Indian religious and yogic philosophies.

His primary ashram in North America, Siddhachalam, located in Blairstown, New Jersey was established in 1983. He was among the founding fathers of American Jainism.

Although he was ordained as a monk in the Sthānakavāsī Jain tradition, he regarded himself to be non-sectarian. In 1979, he formed Arhat Sangh, a syncretic, non-sectarian group within Jainism.

Life
Sushil Kumar was born into a Brahmin household.  As a Jain monk, he traveled on foot thousands of miles across the length and breadth of India.  He represented the Sthānakavāsī Jain tradition in the making of Saman Suttam, a compilation of Jain principles that was acceptable to all sects of Jainism.  He discovered and mastered the secrets of sounds behind the Namokar Mantra, an auspicious rendering that is central to Jains and wrote a book on the subject, Song of the Soul.

For hundreds of years and as long as historical records are available, Jain monks did not use any mechanical means for travel. However, on June 17, 1975, Kumar made the decision to travel outside India by aircraft. He said he was prodded in meditation to do so by the 12 C Acharya, Dadaguru Manidhari Jinchandra Suriji Maharaj. Dadaguru asked him to travel to faraway lands to spread Bhagwan Mahavir's message of ahimsa (non-injury) and anekantavada (belief that no one has a monopoly on truth). This act allowed other Jain monks and nuns to begin using mechanical means of travel, including outside India. The decision caused some controversy in the Jain community.
He has traveled and taught extensively, spreading the message of non-violence and self-awareness.  He has founded many ashrams and centres in the East and West.

During his travels, Kumar helped found many organizations and communities across the globe that engage in promoting ahimsa and anekantavad. One of the principal organizations he founded in North America was the International Mahavira Jain Mission which manages the ashram Siddhachalam that he founded in New Jersey. Siddhachalam is regarded as the first tirtha (site of pilgrimage) outside India.

On March 1, 1980, Sushil Kumar was declared an "Acharya" (master) of Arhat Sangh of the Jain church.

Guruji was  a master of meditation and the science of sound. His teaching system is called Arhum Yoga. It is an ancient system of the mastery of the inner self through watchfulness and direct perception. Arhum yoga encompasses all aspects of philosophy and yogic practice in the Arihant spiritual tradition.

Kumar gained wide recognition as a fountain of wisdom, truth and understanding. He actively promoted peace and harmony throughout India and played a role of peacemaker for conflicting religious groups. He had a strong willed, forceful and articulate personality. An area in which he worked unceasingly was to establish universal brotherhood amongst religious groups of India. At the time of strife in the state of Punjab, he motivated the Sikh leader Master Tara Singh to participate in an open and peaceful dialogue with the government. When Pope John Paul's visit to India was strongly opposed, he spoke in favor of the Pope's visit. His warmth helped the country welcome the Pope. In 1986, he brought Punjab's Akali Leader Sant Longowal and India's Prime Minister Rajiv Gandhi together to reach an accord to end Punjab conflicts and attempts of some to cause Punjab to secede from India. Trusted by both the terrorists and the government, he helped bring about peace in Punjab through the Rajiv–Longowal Accord. His efforts to bring peace in the Punjab during the early 1980s gained wide attention.  Later, in 1992, he was actively involved in promoting dialogue between Muslim and Hindu factions during the Ayodhya dispute.

Acharya Sushil Kumar had a vision of an earth united in the pursuit of ahimsa, peace and brotherhood.  In 1957, he convened a World Religions Conference with more than 1200 representatives from 27 countries and 500,000 people in attendance. His work was not limited to creating religious harmony; he also received acclaim for his pioneering work in the fields of animal and environmental protection. In 1966, he initiated India's cow protection movement to signify protection of the weakest.

From 1954 to 1994, Sushil Kumar organized and presided over several World Religions Conferences which were attended, among others, by then Presidents and Prime Ministers of India, including Pandit Jawahar Lal Nehru, Dr. Rajendra Prasad, Dr. Radhakrishnan, Dr. Zakir Hussain, Fakkruddin Ali Ahmed, Zail Singh and  Indira Gandhi. He also organized several International Jain Conferences which too adopted resolutions of non-violence, peaceful co-existence and reverence to all life forms.

In 1982, Guruji inspired the leaders of eight nations to submit a memorandum demanding peace through non-violence to the Secretary General of the United Nations. He stressed that peace through non-violence alone will ensure the sanctity of human life as well as extend protection to animal life and the environment. Guruji and his devotees rallied along with a million other individuals in New York City in support of the memorandum.

In August 1989, Sushil Kumar was invited to inaugurate and preside over the World Hindu Conference in Britain. Since the Hindus regarded him as one of their spiritual leaders, they enthusiastically embraced his notion of Ahimsa (Non-Violence) and vowed to join him in propagating the virtues of meditation, vegetarianism and unity. That same year, Guruji addressed the World Conference of Religions for Peace in Melbourne, Australia. Advocating the dire need to protect the animal kingdom and our natural environment, he explained that all living beings equally share the right to life. In 1988, Guruji was a distinguished speaker at Vishwa Hindu Sangh Conference held in Nepal, where once again he made moving speeches. In 1990, Guruji was an honored guest at the Global Conference for Human Survival in Moscow. More than 1200 individuals from 70 countries traveled to the USSR to take part in this historic gathering and were present to participate in Guruji's meditation and to listen to his views on the need for non-violence, including Mikhail Gorbachev.  The two discussed various issues relating to the establishment of world peace and global co-operation. In 1991 he traveled to Iran in an attempt to persuade Saddam Hussein to adopt a peaceful resolution to the Gulf Crisis. Although poor roads and the prevailing war conditions prevented him from entering Iraq, Guruji was widely recognized and appreciated for his valiant efforts to stop the Gulf War. At the World Parliament of Religions conference at Chicago in 1993, he delivered the keynote address where he emphasized the need to create a charter of Animal Rights for ecological balance, a key to human survival.

Siddhachalam, a Jain ashram he founded in the U.S., draws pilgrims from around the world. In 1982, the International Mahavir Jain Mission founded by him became affiliated with the United Nations and the concept of Ahimsa was adopted at the Sacred Earth Gathering as a core principle for protecting all forms of life. At the Sacred Earth Gathering held on the sidelines of the 1992 Earth Summit, the World Movement of Non-Violence for Peace and Environment was launched in Rio with Guruji serving as a founding President along with Dr. Robert Muller. That same year, a Jain Studies Department was initiated at Columbia University, New York, and a Jain "Chair" established at  Toronto University in Canada under his inspiration. A Jain Encyclopedia was also incorporated into the Hindu Encyclopedia (Macmillan Press).

Sushil Kumar inspired the founding of many spiritual organizations, including the World Fellowship of Religions (1957) and the Vishwa Ahimsa Sangh (1957). The 25' Centenary Celebration of the 24th  Tirthankara of Jainism, Lord Mahavir, was convened by him in India. He also founded the  International Mahavir Mission (1977), the World Jain Congress (1981) and the World Center of Non-Violence. He was the Honorary President of the World Conference of Religions for Peace, the director of the Temple of Understanding, a Founding Member of the Global Forum of Spiritual and Parliamentary Leaders on Human Survival, President of the Punjab Peace Unity Committee, President of the Ram Janambhoomi-Babri Masjid Solution Committee and a Founding Member of the Vishwa Hindu Parishad. His aim was uniting the world in a State of Ahimsa.

Wherever he journeyed around the world, he was sought after for his wisdom, his loving and childlike simplicity, and for his love and brotherhood. He was known to engage in deep meditation for days at a sitting and easily traverse time, space and lives.  He attained samadhi (left his worldly body) on the 22 April 1994 in New Delhi.

References

Jain acharyas
Indian Jain monks
20th-century Indian Jains
20th-century Jain monks
20th-century Indian monks
1926 births
1994 deaths